The Emperor of Japan is the monarch and the head of the Imperial Family of Japan. Under the Constitution of Japan, he is defined as the symbol of the Japanese state and the unity of the Japanese people, and his position is derived from "the will of the people with whom resides sovereign power". Imperial Household Law governs the line of imperial succession. The emperor is immune from prosecution by the Supreme Court of Japan. He is also the head of the Shinto religion. In Japanese, the emperor is called , literally "Emperor of heaven" or "Heavenly Sovereign". The Japanese Shinto religion holds him to be the direct descendant of the sun goddess Amaterasu. The emperor is also the head of all national Japanese orders, decorations, medals, and awards. In English, the use of the term  for the emperor was once common but is now considered obsolete.

The Imperial House of Japan, known by their name the Yamato Dynasty, is amongst the oldest in the world, with its historical origins in the late Kofun period of the 3rd–6th centuries AD. According to the mythological accounts of the Kojiki and Nihon Shoki, Japan was founded in 660 BC by Emperor Jimmu.

The role of the emperor of Japan has historically alternated between a largely ceremonial symbolic role and that of an actual imperial ruler. Since the establishment of the first shogunate in 1192, the emperors of Japan have rarely taken on a role as supreme battlefield commander, unlike many Western monarchs. Japanese emperors have nearly always been controlled by external political forces, to varying degrees. For example, between 1192 and 1867, the shōguns, or their shikken regents in Kamakura (1203–1333), were the de facto rulers of Japan, although they were nominally appointed by the emperor. After the Meiji Restoration in 1867, the emperor was the embodiment of all sovereign power in the realm, as enshrined in the Meiji Constitution of 1889. Since the enactment of the 1947 constitution, the role of emperor has been relegated to that of a ceremonial head of state without even nominal political powers.

Since the mid-nineteenth century, the Imperial Palace has been called , later , and is located on the former site of Edo Castle in the heart of Tokyo (the current capital of Japan). Earlier, emperors resided in Kyoto (the ancient capital) for nearly eleven centuries. The Emperor's Birthday (currently 23 February) is a national holiday.

Naruhito is the current emperor of Japan. He acceded to the Chrysanthemum Throne upon the abdication of his father, Emperor Akihito, on 1 May 2019.

Constitutional role

Unlike many constitutional monarchs, the emperor is not even the nominal chief executive. Most constitutional monarchies formally vest executive power in the monarch, but the monarch is bound by convention to act on the advice of the cabinet or required to exercise his powers through the ministers. In contrast, Article 65 of the Constitution of Japan explicitly vests executive power in the cabinet, of which the prime minister is the leader. The emperor is also not the commander-in-chief of the Japan Self-Defense Forces. The Japan Self-Defense Forces Act of 1954 explicitly vests this role with the prime minister.

The emperor's powers are limited only to important ceremonial functions. Article 4 of the Constitution stipulates that the Emperor "shall perform only such acts in matters of state as are provided for in the Constitution and he shall not have powers related to government." He is not allowed to make political statements. It also stipulates that "the advice and approval of the Cabinet shall be required for all acts of the Emperor in matters of state" (Article 3). Article 4 also states that these duties can be delegated by the Emperor as provided for by law.

While the emperor formally appoints the prime minister to office, Article 6 of the Constitution requires him to appoint the candidate "as designated by the Diet", without giving the emperor the right to decline appointment.

Article 6 of the Constitution delegates to the emperor the following ceremonial roles:
Appointment of the Prime Minister as designated by the Diet.
Appointment of the Chief Justice of the Supreme Court as designated by the Cabinet.

The emperor's other duties are laid down in Article 7 of the Constitution, where it is stated that "the Emperor, with the advice and approval of the Cabinet, shall perform the following acts in matters of state on behalf of the people." 
 Promulgation of amendments of the constitution, laws, cabinet orders, and treaties.
 Convocation of the Diet.
 Dissolution of the House of Representatives.
 Proclamation of general election of members of the Diet.
 Attestation of the appointment and dismissal of Ministers of State and other officials as provided for by law, and of full powers and credentials of Ambassadors and Ministers.
 Attestation of general and special amnesty, commutation of punishment, reprieve, and restoration of rights.
 Awarding of honors.
 Attestation of instruments of ratification and other diplomatic documents as provided for by law.
 Receiving foreign ambassadors and ministers.
 Performance of ceremonial functions.
In practice, all of these duties are exercised only in accordance with the binding instructions of the Cabinet.

Regular ceremonies of the emperor with a constitutional basis are the Imperial Investitures (Shinninshiki) in the Tokyo Imperial Palace and the Speech from the Throne ceremony in the House of Councillors in the National Diet Building. The latter ceremony opens ordinary and extra sessions of the Diet. Ordinary sessions are opened each January and also after new elections to the House of Representatives. Extra sessions usually convene in the autumn and are opened then.

History
Although the emperor has been a symbol of continuity with the past, the degree of power exercised by the emperor has varied considerably throughout Japanese history.

Origin (7th–8th centuries AD)

The title of emperor was borrowed from China, being derived from Chinese characters, and was retroactively applied to the legendary Japanese rulers who reigned before the 7th–8th centuries AD.

According to the traditional account of the Nihon Shoki, Japan was founded by Emperor Jimmu in 660 BC. However most modern scholars agree that Jimmu and the nine first emperors are mythical.

Modern historians generally believe that the emperors up to Suinin are "largely legendary" as there is insufficient material available for verification and study of their lives. Emperor Sujin (148–30 BC) is the first emperor with a direct possibility of existence according to historians, but he is referred to as "legendary" due to a lack of information.  The emperors from Emperor Keiko to Emperor Ingyo (376–453 AD) are considered as perhaps factual. Emperor Ankō (401–456), traditionally the 20th emperor, is the earliest generally agreed upon historical ruler of all or a part of Japan. The reign of Emperor Kinmei (–571 AD), the 29th emperor, is the first for whom contemporary historiography is able to assign verifiable dates; however, the conventionally accepted names and dates of the early emperors were not confirmed as "traditional" until the reign of Emperor Kanmu (737–806), the 50th sovereign of the Yamato dynasty.

Archaeological information about the earliest historical rulers of Japan may be contained in the ancient tombs known as kofun, constructed between the early 3rd century and the early 7th century AD. However, since the Meiji period, the Imperial Household Agency has refused to open the kofun to the public or to archaeologists, citing their desire not to disturb the spirits of the past emperors. Kofun period artefacts were also increasingly crucial in Japan as the Meiji government used them to legitimise the historical validity of the emperor's reclaimed authority. In December 2006, the Imperial Household Agency reversed its position and decided to allow researchers to enter some of the kofun with no restrictions.

Disputes and Instability (10th century) 

The growth of the samurai class from the 10th century gradually weakened the power of the imperial family over the realm, leading to a time of instability. Emperors are known to have come into conflict with the reigning shogun from time to time. Some instances, such as Emperor Go-Toba's 1221 rebellion against the Kamakura shogunate and the 1336 Kenmu Restoration under Emperor Go-Daigo, show the power struggle between the Imperial Court in Kyoto and the military governments of Japan.

Factional control (530s–1867) and Shōguns (1192–1867) 

There have been six non-imperial families who have controlled Japanese emperors: the Soga (530s–645), the Fujiwara (850s–1070), the Taira (1159–1180s), the Minamoto and Kamakura Bakufu (1192–1333), the Ashikaga (1336–1565), and the Tokugawa (1603–1867). However, every shogun from the Minamoto, Ashikaga, and Tokugawa families had to be officially recognized by the emperors, who were still the source of sovereignty, although they could not exercise their powers independently from the shogunate.

During the major part of 1192 to 1867, political sovereignty of the state was exercised by the shōguns or their shikken regents (1203–1333), whose authority was conferred by Imperial warrant. When Portuguese explorers first came into contact with the Japanese (see Nanban period), they described Japanese conditions in analogy, likening the emperor with great symbolic authority, but little political power, to the pope, and the shōgun to secular European rulers (e.g., the Holy Roman emperor). In keeping with the analogy, they even used the term "emperor" in reference to the shōguns and their regents, e.g. in the case of Toyotomi Hideyoshi, whom missionaries called "Emperor Taico-sama" (from Taikō and the honorific sama). A Dutch embassy report used similar terminology in 1691. Empress Go-Sakuramachi was the last ruling empress of Japan and reigned from 1762 to 1771. During the Sakoku period of 1603 to 1868, there was very limited trade between Japan and foreigners. The Dutch were the only westerners who had limited access to Japan.

Kenmu Restoration (1333–1336) 

Emperor Go-Daigo succeeded in 1333 to get back the direct authority directly to the emperor after overthrowing the Kamakura shogunate, with the help of Ashikaga Takauji, a defected Kamakura general. The short three-year period during which the power was directly in the hand of the emperor is called the Kenmu Restoration. The direct ruling of the emperor proved however inefficient and ultimately failed, with Takauji grabbing political power for himself.

Meiji Restoration (1868)

In July 1853, Commodore Perry's Black Ships of the US Navy made their first visit to Edo Bay. Japan lacked the military and industrial power to prevent it. Unequal treaties coerced and took advantage of Japan. Consequently, Japan was forcibly opened to foreign trade and the shogunate proved incapable of hindering the "barbarian" interlopers, Emperor Kōmei began to assert himself politically. By the early 1860s, the relationship between the Imperial Court and the shogunate was changing radically. Disaffected domains and rōnin began to rally to the call of sonnō jōi ("revere the emperor, expel the barbarians"). The domains of Satsuma and Chōshū, historic enemies of the Tokugawa, used this turmoil to unite their forces and won an important military victory outside of Kyoto against Tokugawa forces.

On November 9, 1867, the Shogun Tokugawa Yoshinobu formally stepped down to restore Emperor Meiji to nominal full power. The Meiji Constitution was adopted on February 11, 1889. The emperor of Japan became an active ruler with considerable political power over foreign policy and diplomacy which was shared with an elected Imperial Diet. The Japanese subjects gained many rights and duties.

The constitution described the emperor (in Article 4) as: "the head of the Empire, combining in Himself the rights of sovereignty", and he “exercises them, according to the provisions of the present Constitution”. His rights included to sanction and promulgate laws, to execute them and to exercise "supreme command of the Army and the Navy". The liaison conference created in 1893 also made the emperor the leader of the Imperial General Headquarters.

World War II (1939–1945)

Emperor Shōwa, known by his personal name as Hirohito in the West, was in power during World War II; he controlled both the sovereign of the state and the imperial forces. The role of the emperor as head of the State Shinto religion was exploited during the war, creating an Imperial cult that led to kamikaze bombers and other manifestations of fanaticism. This in turn led to the requirement in the Potsdam Declaration for the elimination "for all time of the authority and influence of those who have deceived and misled the people of Japan into embarking on world conquest".

Following Japan's surrender, the Allies issued the Shinto Directive separating church and state within Japan. In 1946, Hirohito was forced to proclaim the Humanity Declaration, but the declaration excludes the word , including the unusual word  instead. As such, some experts doubt whether his divinity was renounced. Jean Herbert said it would be inadmissible to deny his divine origin.

Hirohito was excluded from the postwar Tokyo War Crimes Tribunal. Scholars dispute the power he had and the role he played during WWII. Hirohito's reign from 1926 until his death in 1989 makes him the longest-lived and longest-reigning historical Japanese emperor, and one of the longest-reigning monarchs in the world.

Contemporary (1978–present) 
The Emperor of Japan has never visited Yasukuni Shrine since 1978. Hirohito maintained an official boycott of Yasukuni Shrine after it was revealed to him that Class-A war criminals had secretly been enshrined. The boycott was continued by his successors, Akihito and Naruhito.

By 1979, Emperor Shōwa was the only monarch in the world with the monarchical title "emperor." Emperor Shōwa was the longest-reigning historical monarch in Japanese's history and the world's longest reigning monarch until surpassed by King Bhumibol Adulyadej of Thailand in July 2008.

According to journalist Makoto Inoue of The Nikkei, Emperor Emeritus Akihito wanted to be closer to the people, rather than be treated like a god or robot. Inoue believes that during his reign, he transformed the symbolic role of emperor into a human being. In March 2019, the Mainichi reported 87% thought Akihito fulfilled his role as symbol of the state.

On April 30, 2019, Emperor Akihito abdicated due to health issues. The previous time abdication occurred was Emperor Kōkaku in 1817. Naruhito ascended on May 1, 2019, referred to as Kinjō Tennō.

Current constitution 
In 1947 the post-war  became law when it received the emperor's assent on 3 November 1946. It provides for a parliamentary system of government and guarantees certain fundamental rights. Under its terms, the emperor of Japan is "the symbol of the State and of the unity of the people" and exercises a purely ceremonial role without the possession of sovereignty. It was drawn up under the Allied occupation that followed World War II and changed Japan's previous Prussian-style Meiji Constitution that granted the emperor theoretically unlimited powers. The liberal constitution was inspired by several European states. Currently, it is a rigid document and the oldest unamended constitution.

Realm and territories 

Historically, territorial designations are not a requirement for the position of Tennō (emperor). Rather it is the emperor's symbolic and religious power of authority. Since the Kamakura shogunate, the emperor held de jure ownership of the realm. Throughout most of medieval Japan, the shogun's legitimate authority was based on being appointed and receiving the power from the emperor even though the shogun was the de-facto ruler. The emperor was considered a direct descendant of Amaterasu and of utmost importance in the Shinto religion and sentimental traditions. Thus no shogun tried to usurp the emperor, instead they tried to keep the emperor under control and away from politics. However, the emperor still had the power to "control time" via the Japanese Nengō which names eras on calendars after emperors. Thus even if he has followers only in one province (as was the case sometimes with the southern and northern courts).

During the Kofun period the first central government of the unified state was Yamato in the Kinai region of central Japan. The territory of Japan has changed throughout history. Its largest extent was the Empire of Japan. After its defeat in World War II the empire was dismantled. The contemporary territories include the Japanese archipelago and these areas. Regardless of territorial changes the emperor remains the formal head of state of Japan. During most of history, de facto power was with shoguns or prime ministers. The emperor was more like a revered embodiment of divine harmony than the head of an actual governing administration. In Japan, it was more effective for ambitious daimyo (feudal lords) to hold actual power, as such positions were not inherently contradictory to the emperor's position. The shoguns and prime ministers derived their legitimacy from the emperor. The parliamentary government continues a similar coexistence with the emperor.
The first recorded instance of the name Nihon  was between 665 and 703 during the Asuka period. This was several centuries after the start of the current imperial line. The various names of Japan do not affect the status of the emperor as head of state.

Education 
The emperors traditionally had an education officer. In recent times, Emperor Taishō had Count Nogi Maresuke, Emperor Shōwa had Marshal-Admiral Marquis Tōgō Heihachirō, and Emperor Akihito had Elizabeth Gray Vining as well as Shinzō Koizumi as their tutors.

Emperors, including his family, had to get an education at Gakushuin University by the Meiji Constitution.

Reference and naming
Tennō refers only to an emperor of Japan, and kōtei refers to an emperor of any countries. Sumeramikoto ("the imperial person") was also used in Old Japanese. Emperors used the term tennō up until the Middle Ages; then, following a period of disuse, again from the 19th century. The weakened power of the emperors led to the title tennō not being used from 1200 to 1840; during this time, living emperors were called shujō (主上) and deceased ones were called in (院). Other titles that were recorded to be in use were kō (皇), tei (帝), ō (王), all meaning "prince" or "emperor", and tenshi (天子), or "child of heaven".

In English, the term mikado ( or ), literally meaning "the honorable gate" (i.e. the gate of the imperial palace, which indicates the person who lives in and possesses the palace; confer Sublime Porte, an old term for the Ottoman government), was once used (as in The Mikado, a 19th-century operetta), but this term is now obsolete.

Traditionally, the Japanese considered it disrespectful to call any person by their given name, and more so for a person of noble rank. This convention is only slightly relaxed in the modern age and it is still inadvisable among friends to use the given name, use of the family name being the common form of address. In the case of the imperial family, it is considered extremely inappropriate to use the given name. Since Emperor Meiji, it has been customary to have one era per emperor and to rename each emperor after his death using the name of the era over which he presided. Before Emperor Meiji, the names of the eras were changed more frequently, and the posthumous names of the emperors were chosen differently.

Hirohito was never referred to by his name in Japan. He was given the posthumous name Shōwa Tennō after his death, which is the only name that Japanese speakers currently use when referring to him.

The current emperor on the throne is typically referred to as Tennō Heika ("His [Imperial] Majesty the Emperor"), Kinjō Heika ("His Current Majesty") or simply Tennō, when speaking Japanese. Emperor Akihito received the title Daijō Tennō (Emperor Emeritus), often shortened to Jōkō, upon his abdication on 30 April 2019, and is expected to be renamed Heisei Tennō after his death and will then be referred to exclusively by that name in Japanese.

Origin of the title

The oldest diplomatic reference to the title  (Tenshi, Emperor or Son of Heaven) can be found in a diplomatic document sent from Emperor Suiko to the Sui Dynasty of China in 607. In this document, Empress Suiko introduced herself to Emperor Yang of Sui as 日出處天子 (Hi izurutokoro no tenshi) meaning "Emperor of the land where the sun rises". The oldest documented use of the title  (Tennō, heavenly emperor) appears on a wooden slat, or mokkan, that was unearthed in Asuka-mura, Nara Prefecture in 1998 and dated back to the reign of Emperor Tenmu and Empress Jitō in the 7th century.

Marriage traditions

Throughout history, Japanese emperors and noblemen appointed a spouse to the position of chief wife, rather than just keeping a harem or an assortment of female attendants.

The Japanese imperial dynasty consistently practiced official polygamy until the Taishō period (1912–1926). Besides his empress, the emperor could take, and nearly always took, several secondary consorts ("concubines") of various hierarchical degrees. Concubines were allowed also to other dynasts (Shinnōke, Ōke). After a decree by Emperor Ichijō, some emperors even had two empresses simultaneously (identified by the separate titles kōgō and chūgū). With the help of all this polygamy, the imperial clan could produce more offspring. (Sons by secondary consorts were usually recognized as imperial princes, too, and such a son could be recognized as heir to the throne if the empress did not give birth to an heir.)

Of the eight reigning empresses of Japan, none married or gave birth after ascending the throne. Some of them, being widows, had produced children before their reigns. In the succession, children of the empress were preferred over sons of secondary consorts. Thus it was significant which quarters had preferential opportunities in providing chief wives to imperial princes, i.e. supplying future empresses.

Apparently, the oldest tradition of official marriages within the imperial dynasty involved marriages between dynasty members, even between half-siblings or between uncle and niece. Such marriages were deemed to preserve better the imperial blood; or they aimed at producing children symbolic of a reconciliation between two branches of the imperial dynasty. Daughters of other families remained concubines until Emperor Shōmu (701–706)in what was specifically reported as the first elevation of its kindelevated his Fujiwara consort Empress Kōmyō to chief wife.

Japanese monarchs have been, as much as others elsewhere, dependent on making alliances with powerful chiefs and with other monarchs. Many such alliances were sealed by marriages. However, in Japan such marriages soon became incorporated as elements of tradition which controlled the marriages of later generations, though the original practical alliance had lost its real meaning. A repeated pattern saw an imperial son-in-law under the influence of his powerful non-imperial father-in-law.

Beginning from the 7th and 8th centuries, emperors primarily took women of the Fujiwara clan as their highest-ranking wives – the most probable mothers of future monarchs. This was cloaked as a tradition of marriage between heirs of two kami (Shinto deities): descendants of Amaterasu with descendants of the family kami of the Fujiwara. (Originally, the Fujiwara descended from relatively minor nobility, thus their kami is an unremarkable one in the Japanese myth world.) To produce imperial children, heirs of the nation, with two-side descent from the two kami, was regarded as desirable – or at least it suited powerful Fujiwara lords, who thus received preference in the imperial marriage-market. The reality behind such marriages was an alliance between an imperial prince and a Fujiwara lord (his father-in-law or grandfather), the latter with his resources supporting the prince to the throne and most often controlling the government. These arrangements established the tradition of regents (Sesshō and Kampaku), with these positions held only by a Fujiwara sekke lord.

Earlier, the emperors had married women from families of the government-holding Soga lords, and women of the imperial clan, i.e. various-degree cousins and often even their own half-sisters. Several imperial figures of the 5th and 6th centuries such as Prince Shōtoku (574–622) were children of half-sibling couples. Such marriages often served as alliance or succession devices: the Soga lord ensured his domination of a prince who would be put on the throne as a puppet; or a prince ensured the combination of two imperial descents, to strengthen his own and his children's claim to the throne. Marriages were also a means to seal a reconciliation between two imperial branches.

After a couple of centuries, emperors could no longer take anyone from outside such families as a primary wife, no matter what the potential expediency of such a marriage and the power or wealth offered by such a match. Only very rarely did a prince ascend the throne whose mother was not descended from the approved families. The earlier necessity and expediency had mutated into a strict tradition that did not allow for current expediency or necessity, but only prescribed the daughters of a restricted circle of families as eligible brides, because they had produced eligible brides for centuries. Tradition had become more forceful than law.

Fujiwara women often became empresses, while concubines came from less exalted noble families. In the last thousand years, sons of an imperial male and a Fujiwara woman have been preferred in the succession. The five Fujiwara families, Ichijō, Kujō, Nijō, Konoe, and Takatsukasa, functioned as the primary source of imperial brides from the 8th century to the 19th century, even more often than daughters of the imperial clan itself. Fujiwara daughters were thus the usual empresses and mothers of emperors. The Meiji-era Imperial House Law of 1889 made this restriction on brides for the emperor and crown prince explicit. A clause stipulated that daughters of Sekke (the five main branches of the higher Fujiwara) and daughters of the imperial clan itself were primarily acceptable brides. The law was repealed in the aftermath of World War II. In 1959 the future Emperor Akihito became the first crown-prince for over a thousand years to marry a consort from outside the previously eligible circle.

Three Sacred Treasures 

In Japanese mythology, the sacred treasures were bestowed on Ninigi-no-Mikoto, the grandson of the goddess Amaterasu, at the advent of Tenson kōrin. Amaterasu sent him to pacify Japan by bringing the three celestial gifts that are used by the emperor. The account of Ninigi being sent to earth appears in the Nihon Shoki. The Three Sacred Treasures were inherited by successive Japanese emperors, which are the same as or similar to the sacred treasures in mythology. These three gifts signify that the emperor is the descendant of Amaterasu. The three sacred treasures are:

Yata no Kagami (kept at the Ise Grand Shrine, with a replica at the central shrine of the Three Palace Sanctuaries)
Yasakani no Magatama (kept at the central shrine of the Three Palace Sanctuaries)
Kusanagi sword (kept at the Atsuta Shrine)

During the succession rite (senso, 践祚), possessing the jewel Yasakani no Magatama, the sword Kusanagi and the mirror Yata no Kagami are a testament of the legitimate serving emperor.

Succession

The origins of the Japanese imperial dynasty are obscure, and it bases its position on the claim that it has "reigned since time immemorial". There are no records of any emperor who was not said to have been a descendant of other, yet earlier emperor. There is suspicion that Emperor Keitai (c. AD 500) may have been an unrelated outsider, though the sources (Kojiki, Nihon-Shoki) state that he was a male-line descendant of Emperor Ōjin. However, his descendants, including his successors, were according to records descended from at least one and probably several imperial princesses of the older lineage.

Millennia ago, the Japanese imperial family developed its own peculiar system of hereditary succession. It has been non-primogenitural, more or less agnatic, based mostly on rotation. Today, Japan uses strict agnatic primogeniture, which was adopted from Prussia, by which Japan was greatly influenced in the 1870s.

The controlling principles and their interaction were apparently very complex and sophisticated, leading to even idiosyncratic outcomes. Some chief principles apparent in the succession have been:
 Women were allowed to succeed (but there existed no known children of theirs whose father did not also happen to be an agnate of the imperial house, thus there is neither a precedent that a child of an imperial woman with a non-imperial man could inherit, nor a precedent forbidding it for children of empresses). However, female accession was clearly much more rare than male.
 Adoption was possible and a much used way to increase the number of succession-entitled heirs (however, the adopted child had to be a child of another member agnate of the imperial house).
 Abdication was used very often, and in fact occurred more often than death on the throne. In those days, the emperor's chief task was priestly (or godly), containing so many repetitive rituals that it was deemed that after a service of around ten years, the incumbent deserved pampered retirement as an honored former emperor.
 Primogeniture was not used – rather, in the early days, the imperial house practiced something resembling a system of rotation. Very often a brother (or sister) followed the elder sibling even in the case of the predecessor leaving children. The "turn" of the next generation came more often after several individuals of the senior generation. Rotation went often between two or more of the branches of the imperial house, thus more or less distant cousins succeeded each other. Emperor Go-Saga even decreed an official alternation between heirs of his two sons, which system continued for a couple of centuries (leading finally to shogun-induced (or utilized) strife between these two branches, the "southern" and "northern" emperors). Towards the end, the alternates were very distant cousins counted in degrees of male descent (but all that time, intermarriages occurred within the imperial house, thus they were close cousins if female ties are counted). During the past five hundred years, however, probably because of Confucian influence, inheritance by sons – but not always, or even most often, the eldest son has been the norm.

Historically, the succession to the Chrysanthemum Throne has always passed to descendants in male line from the imperial lineage. Generally, they have been males, though over the reign of one hundred monarchs there have been nine women (one pre-historical and eight historical) as emperor on eleven occasions.

Over a thousand years ago, a tradition started that an emperor should ascend relatively young. A dynast who had passed his toddler years was regarded suitable and old enough. Reaching the age of legal majority was not a requirement. Thus, a multitude of Japanese emperors have ascended as children, as young as 6 or 8 years old. The high-priestly duties were deemed possible for a walking child. A reign of around 10 years was regarded a sufficient service. Being a child was apparently a fine property, to better endure tedious duties and to tolerate subjugation to political power-brokers, as well as sometimes to cloak the truly powerful members of the imperial dynasty. Almost all Japanese empresses and dozens of emperors abdicated and lived the rest of their lives in pampered retirement, wielding influence behind the scenes. Several emperors abdicated to their entitled retirement while still in their teens. These traditions show in Japanese folklore, theater, literature, and other forms of culture, where the emperor is usually described or depicted as an adolescent.

Before the Meiji Restoration, Japan had eleven reigns of reigning empresses, all of them daughters of the male line of the Imperial House. None ascended purely as a wife or as a widow of an emperor. Imperial daughters and granddaughters, however, usually ascended the throne as a sort of a "stop gap" measure – if a suitable male was not available or some imperial branches were in rivalry so that a compromise was needed. Over half of Japanese empresses and many emperors abdicated once a suitable male descendant was considered to be old enough to rule (just past toddlerhood, in some cases). Four empresses, Empress Suiko, Empress Kōgyoku (also Empress Saimei), and Empress Jitō, as well as the legendary Empress Jingū, were widows of deceased emperors and princesses of the blood imperial in their own right. One, Empress Genmei, was the widow of a crown prince and a princess of the blood imperial. The other four, Empress Genshō, Empress Kōken (also Empress Shōtoku), Empress Meishō, and Empress Go-Sakuramachi, were unwed daughters of previous emperors. None of these empresses married or gave birth after ascending the throne.

Article 2 of the Meiji Constitution (the Constitution of the Empire of Japan) stated, "The Imperial Throne shall be succeeded to by imperial male descendants, according to the provisions of the Imperial House Law." The 1889 Imperial Household Law fixed the succession on male descendants of the imperial line, and specifically excluded female descendants from the succession. In the event of a complete failure of the main line, the throne would pass to the nearest collateral branch, again in the male line. If the empress did not give birth to an heir, the emperor could take a concubine, and the son he had by that concubine would be recognized as heir to the throne. This law, which was promulgated on the same day as the Meiji Constitution, enjoyed co-equal status with that constitution.

Article 2 of the Constitution of Japan, promulgated in 1947 by influence of the U.S. occupation administration, provides that "The Imperial Throne shall be dynastic and succeeded to in accordance with the Imperial Household Law passed by the Diet." The Imperial Household Law of 1947, enacted by the ninety-second and last session of the Imperial Diet, retained the exclusion on female dynasts found in the 1889 law. The government of Prime Minister Yoshida Shigeru hastily cobbled together the legislation to bring the Imperial Household in compliance with the American-written Constitution of Japan that went into effect in May 1947. In an effort to control the size of the imperial family, the law stipulates that only legitimate male descendants in the male line can be dynasts, that imperial princesses lose their status as imperial family members if they marry outside the imperial family, and that the emperor and other members of the Imperial Family may not adopt children. It also prevented branches, other than the branch descending from Taishō, from being imperial princes any longer.

Current status

Succession is now regulated by laws passed by the National Diet. The current law excludes women from the succession. A change to this law had been considered until Princess Kiko gave birth to Prince Hisahito.

Until the birth of Hisahito, son of Prince Akishino, on September 6, 2006, there was a potential succession problem, since Prince Akishino was the only male child to be born into the imperial family since 1965. Following the birth of Princess Aiko, there was public debate about amending the current Imperial Household Law to allow women to succeed to the throne. In January 2005, Prime Minister Junichiro Koizumi appointed a special panel composed of judges, university professors, and civil servants to study changes to the Imperial Household Law and to make recommendations to the government.

The panel dealing with the succession issue recommended on October 25, 2005, amending the law to allow females of the male line of imperial descent to ascend the Japanese throne. On January 20, 2006, Prime Minister Junichiro Koizumi devoted part of his annual keynote speech to the controversy, pledging to submit a bill allowing women to ascend the throne to ensure that the succession continues in the future in a stable manner. Shortly after the announcement that Princess Kiko was pregnant with her third child, Koizumi suspended such plans. Her son, Prince Hisahito, is the third in line to the throne under the current law of succession. On January 3, 2007, Prime Minister Shinzō Abe announced that he would drop the proposal to alter the Imperial Household Law.

Another proposed plan is to allow unmarried men from the abolished collateral branches of the imperial family to rejoin through adoption or marriage. This would be an emergency measure to ensure stable succession. It does not revise the Imperial Household Law. This does not restore the royalty of the 11 collateral branches of the Imperial House that were abolished in October 1947.

Crown Prince Akishino was formally declared first in line to the chrysanthemum throne on November 8, 2020.

Burial traditions

During the Kofun period, so-called "archaic funerals" were held for the dead emperors, but only the funerary rites from the end of the period, which the chronicles describe in more detail, are known. They were centered around the rite of the mogari, a provisional depository between death and permanent burial.

Empress Jitō was the first Japanese imperial personage to be cremated (in 703). After that, with a few exceptions, all emperors were cremated up to the Edo period. For the next 350 years, in-ground burial became the favoured funeral custom. Until 1912, the emperors were usually buried in Kyoto. From Emperor Taishō onward, the emperors have been buried at the Musashi Imperial Graveyard in Tokyo.

In 2013, the Imperial Household Agency announced that Emperor Akihito and Empress Michiko would be cremated after they die.

Wealth

Until the end of World War II, the Japanese monarchy was thought to be among the wealthiest in the world. Before 1911, no distinction was made between the imperial crown estates and the emperor's personal properties, which were considerable. The Imperial Property Law, which came into effect in January 1911, established two categories of imperial properties: the hereditary or crown estates and the personal ("ordinary") properties of the imperial family. The Imperial Household Minister was given the responsibility for observing any judicial proceedings concerning imperial holdings. Under the terms of the law, imperial properties were only taxable in cases where no conflict with the Imperial House Law existed; however, crown estates could only be used for public or imperially-sanctioned undertakings. Personal properties of certain members of the imperial family, in addition to properties held for imperial family members who were minors, were exempted from taxation. Those family members included the Empress Dowager, the Empress, the Crown Prince and Crown Princess, the Imperial Grandson and the consort of the Imperial Grandson. As a result of the poor economic conditions in Japan, 289,259.25 acres of crown lands (about 26% of the total landholdings) were either sold or transferred to government and private-sector interests in 1921. In 1930, the Nagoya Detached Palace (Nagoya Castle) was donated to the city of Nagoya, with six other imperial villas being either sold or donated at the same time. In 1939, Nijō Castle, the former Kyoto residence of the Tokugawa shoguns and an imperial palace since the Meiji Restoration, was likewise donated to the city of Kyoto.

At the end of 1935, according to official government figures, the Imperial Court owned roughly 3,111,965 acres of landed estates, the bulk of which (2,599,548 acres) were the emperor's private lands, with the total acreage of the crown estates amounting to some 512,161 acres; those landholdings comprised palace complexes, forest and farm lands and other residential and commercial properties. The total value of the imperial properties was then estimated at ¥650 million, or roughly US$195 million at prevailing exchange rates. This was in addition to the emperor's personal fortune, which amounted to hundreds of millions of yen and included numerous family heirlooms and furnishings, purebred livestock and investments in major Japanese firms, such as the Bank of Japan, other major Japanese banks, the Imperial Hotel and Nippon Yusen.

Following Japan's defeat in the Second World War, all of the collateral branches of the imperial family were abolished under the Allied occupation of the country and the subsequent constitutional reforms, forcing those families to sell their assets to private or government owners. Staff numbers in the imperial households were slashed from a peak of roughly 6,000 to about 1,000. The imperial estates and the emperor's personal fortune (then estimated at US$17.15 million, or roughly US$625 million in 2017 terms) were transferred to either state or private ownership, excepting 6,810 acres of landholdings. Since the 1947 constitutional reforms, the imperial family has been supported by an official civil list sanctioned by the Japanese government. The largest imperial divestments were the former imperial Kiso and Amagi forest lands in Gifu and Shizuoka prefectures, grazing lands for livestock in Hokkaido and a stock farm in the Chiba region, all of which were transferred to the Ministry of Agriculture, Forestry and Fisheries. Imperial property holdings have been further reduced since 1947 after several handovers to the government. Today, the primary imperial properties include the two imperial palaces at Tokyo and Kyoto, several imperial villas and a number of imperial farms and game preserves.

As of 2017, Akihito has an estimated net worth of US$40 million. The wealth and expenditures of the emperor and the imperial family have remained a subject of speculation and were largely withheld from the public until 2003, when Mori Yohei, a former royal correspondent for the Mainichi Shimbun, obtained access to 200 documents through a recently passed public information law. Mori's findings, which he published in a book, revealed details of the imperial family's US$240 million civil list (in 2003 values). Among other details, the book revealed the imperial family employed a staff of over 1,000 people. The total cost of events related to the enthronement of Emperor Naruhito was approximately 16.6 billion yen ($150 million) in 2019. This is 30% higher than Emperor Emeritus Akihito's accession (1990).

See also

 Anti-monarchism in Japan
 Arjan bowl
 Chrysanthemum taboo
 Controversies regarding the role of the Emperor of Japan
 Daijō Tennō
 Divine right of kings
 Japanese Air Force One
 Japanese honors system
 Japanese imperial family tree
 Japanese official state car
 List of emperors of Japan
 Reigning Emperor
 Sacred king
 State Shinto

References

Informational notes

Citations

General and cited references 
 Asakawa, Kan'ichi (1903).  The Early Institutional Life of Japan. Tokyo: Shueisha. . Online, multi-formatted, full-text book at openlibrary.org.
 Bar-On Cohen, Einat (2012–12). "The Forces of Homology—Hirohito, Emperor of Japan and the 1928 Rites of Succession". History and Anthropology. 23 (4): 425–443. . .
 
  Alternate link .
 
 Large, Stephen S. (1992). Emperor Hirohito and Shōwa Japan: A Political Biography. London: Routledge. . .
 
 Pye, Lucian W.; Keene, Donald (2002). "Emperor of Japan: Meiji and His World, 1852-1912". Foreign Affairs. 81 (5): 217. . .
 
 Screech, Timon (2006). Secret Memoirs of the Shoguns: Isaac Titsingh and Japan, 1779–1822. London: RoutledgeCurzon. ; .
 Shillony, Ben-Ami (2008). The Emperors of Modern Japan. Leiden: Brill. . .
 
 Titsingh, Isaac (1834). Nihon Ōdai Ichiran  Annales des empereurs du Japon pp. 411–412, Paris: Royal Asiatic Society, Oriental Translation Fund of Great Britain and Ireland.

External links

 Emperor of Japan - World History Encyclopedia
 The Imperial Household Agency
 List of the Emperors, accompanied with the regents and shoguns during their reign and a genealogical tree of the imperial family
 The Emperor of Japan, explanation of the title of Emperor in the context of western terminology
 Japan opens imperial tombs for research
 Emperor of Japan's New Year Address 2017 (YouTube)

Deified Japanese people
Political history of Japan
Japanese emperors
Japanese Shintoists
Ceremonial heads of state
Articles containing video clips
7th-century BC establishments
660 BC